Tyrone Township may refer to:

 Tyrone Township, Franklin County, Illinois
 Tyrone Township, Kent County, Michigan
 Tyrone Township, Livingston County, Michigan
 Tyrone Township, Le Sueur County, Minnesota
 Tyrone Township, Williams County, North Dakota, in Williams County, North Dakota
 Tyrone Township, Adams County, Pennsylvania
 Tyrone Township, Blair County, Pennsylvania
 Tyrone Township, Perry County, Pennsylvania

See also
 Tyrone (disambiguation)

Township name disambiguation pages